Lycoptera is an extinct genus of fish that lived from Lower Cretaceous, Barremian to Aptian in present-day China, North Korea, Mongolia and Siberia. Although there is record from Jurassic Formation in Siberia, its age remains questionable.  It is known from abundant fossils representing sixteen species, which serve as important index fossil used to date geologic formations in China. Along with the genus Peipiaosteus, Lycoptera has been considered a defining member of the Jehol Biota, a prehistoric ecosystem famous for its feathered dinosaurs, which flourished for 20 million years during the Early Cretaceous, where it occurs abundantly in often monospecific beds, where they are thought to have died in seasonal mass death events. Lycoptera is a crown group teleost belonging to an early diverging lineage of the Osteoglossomorpha, which contains living mooneyes, arapaima, arowana, elephantfish and knifefish/featherbacks.

Description

Lycoptera species were small freshwater fish. Most species fed on plankton, and had numerous tiny teeth. A few species like L. gansuensis, L. muroii, and L. sinensis had larger teeth and probably fed on small insects and their larvae.

Many specimens preserve minute details and impressions of soft tissues. Lycoptera was covered in tiny oval scales about 1.2 millimeters across, and, in life, would have had a superficial resemblance to the Common minnow.

Lycoptera fossils are commonly found in large groups, buried together quickly in fine lake sediments likely due to mass death events from seasonal upwelling of anoxic waters during late autumn and winter. This had led to suggestions that they were gregarious in life, congregating in shoals.

Classification and species

Sixteen species of Lycoptera have been described, nine from the Jehol Group. The table below is based primarily on the valid species listed by Zhang and Jin in the 2008 book The Jehol Fossils.

References

Early Cretaceous fish of Asia
Jurassic bony fish
Cretaceous bony fish
Late Jurassic first appearances
Early Cretaceous extinctions
Fossil taxa described in 1847
Osteoglossomorpha
Prehistoric ray-finned fish genera